Westheimer Air Park  was a privately owned, public-use airport in unincorporated Fort Bend County, Texas, United States. It was located along Farm to Market Road 1093 east of Fulshear. The airport was closed in March 2015.

Facilities and aircraft 
It had one runway designated 11/29 with a  concrete surface.

For the 12-month period ending September 2, 2004, the airport had 6,000 general aviation aircraft operations, an average of 16 per day. At that time there were 28 aircraft based at this airport: 96% single-engine and 4% multi-engine.

References

External links 
 Abandoned & Little-Known Airfields: Texas, Western Houston area

Airports in Greater Houston
Buildings and structures in Fort Bend County, Texas
Transportation in Fort Bend County, Texas
Airports disestablished in 2015
Airports established in 1981
Defunct airports in Texas